Max T. Eisen  (15 March 1929 – 7 July 2022) was a Slovak author, public speaker, and Holocaust educator. He travelled throughout Canada giving talks about his experiences as a concentration camp survivor, to students, teachers, universities, law enforcement personnel, and the community at large.

He had worked with the March of the Living, the Sarah and Chaim Neuberger Holocaust Education Centre, the Simon Wiesenthal Centre, and the Canadian Centre for Diversity and Inclusion (CCDI).

With the encouragement of German lawyer Thomas Walther, Eisen testified in Germany at the trial of two former SS guards at Auschwitz: Reinhold Hanning (in 2016) and Oskar Gröning (2015). Both were convicted at their trials. He had been an active participant in March of the Living having made the journey back to Auschwitz-Birkenau, with thousands of students, 18 times.

Early life 
Eisen was born in Moldava nad Bodvou, Czechoslovakia, into an Orthodox Jewish family with two brothers and a baby sister. Along with his immediate family, Eisen lived with his uncle, aunt and paternal grandparents and was surrounded by a large extended family of some 60 members.

Eisen would live through a 13-day death march from Auschwitz to Loslau and there he was  loaded onto metal boxcars made for transporting coal and sent to Mauthausen. Then from Melk he participated in a three-day march in the mountains to Ebensee. He was liberated on 6 May 1945. From Max's large extended family, only two cousins returned. Max arrived in Quebec City on 25 October 1949, and was sent to Toronto by the Canadian Jewish community. He married Ivy Cosman, with whom he had two children, two grandchildren and three great-grandchildren.

Rescue 
Eisen attributed his survival, in part, to the heroism of a member of the Polish resistance and to a US Army liberator. Dr. Tadeusz Orzeszko, the chief surgeon in the surgery department in Auschwitz, took pity on the 15 year old Eisen. He operated on him after a brutal beating by a Nazi guard and engaged him to be his assistant. Many years later, Eisen learned that Orzeszko was a member of the Polish resistance in Auschwitz. Sgt. Johnnie Steven, of the African American 761st Tank Battalion (United States) known as the Black Panthers, liberated Eisen on 6 May 1945.

Portions of Max Eisen’s story appear in the film Come Out Fighting:  The 761st (2002) directed by Fern Levitt

By Chance Alone 

The book won the 2019 edition of Canada Reads, where it was defended by Ziya Tong.

Testimony at war crimes trial 
With the encouragement of German lawyer Thomas Walther, Eisen testified at the trials of former Auschwitz guards Oskar Groening (also known as the "bookkeeper" of Auschwitz) and Reinhold Hanning. Both were known to be members of the SS-Totenkopfverbände.

References 

1929 births
2022 deaths
Auschwitz concentration camp survivors
21st-century Canadian non-fiction writers
21st-century Canadian male writers
Canadian male non-fiction writers
Jewish Canadian writers
Canadian people of Slovak-Jewish descent
Slovak emigrants to Canada
Canadian memoirists
21st-century memoirists
Members of the Order of Canada
Writers from Toronto
People from North York
People from Košice-okolie District